Tampico is a village located in Tampico Township, Whiteside County, Illinois, United States next to Rock Falls and Sterling, Illinois. As of the 2010 census the village had a total population of 790, up from 772 at the 2000 census. It is known as the birthplace of Ronald Reagan, the 40th President of the United States.

History
The area containing the future Tampico township was a  slough. The first nonaboriginal settlers arrived in 1852. The township of Tampico was established in 1861. In 1863-64, the area was drained. The local railroad CB&Q went into service in 1871 and was taken out in the early 1980s. In June 1874, a tornado struck, destroying 27 buildings. In 1875, the village of Tampico was incorporated.

Geography

Tampico is located at  (41.6304686 -89.7853130).

Demographics

At the 2000 census there were 772 people, 292 households, and 205 families in the village. The racial makeup of the village was 99.74% White, 0.00% Black, 0.00% Native American, 0.00% Asian, 0.00% Pacific Islander, 0.13% from other races, and 0.13% from two or more races. 1.55% of the population were Hispanic or Latino of any race.

There were 292 households, 33.2% had children under the age of 18 living with them, 57.2% were married couples living together, 9.2% had a female householder with no husband present, and 29.5% were non-families. 24.7% of households were one person and 13.0% were one person aged 65 or older. The average household size was 2.64 and the average family size was 3.10.

The age distribution was 28.9% under the age of 18, 7.9% from 18 to 24, 26.2% from 25 to 44, 23.6% from 45 to 64, and 13.5% 65 or older. The median age was 36 years. For every 100 females, there were 102.1 males. For every 100 females age 18 and over, there were 102.6 males.

The median household income was $40,221 and the median family income  is $43,646. Males had a median income of $30,667 versus $18,409 for females. The per capita income for the village was $14,467. 8.5% of the population and 6.4% of families were below the poverty line. Out of the total population, 10.2% of those under the age of 18 and 4.6% of those 65 and older were living below the poverty line.

Notable people 

 Hazel A. McCaskrin, Illinois state legislator; born in Tampico
 Ronald Reagan, 40th President of the United States; born in Tampico
 Joseph M. Reeves, U.S. Navy Admiral and veteran of the Spanish–American War, World War I and World War II, born in Tampico

See also

 Birthplace of Ronald Reagan
 H. C. Pitney Variety Store Building
 Tampico Main Street Historic District

References

External links
 Official website
 Tampico Area Historical Society & Museum

 
Villages in Whiteside County, Illinois
Villages in Illinois
Ronald Reagan
Ronald Reagan Trail
Populated places established in 1875
1875 establishments in Illinois